The Maltese cross is the symbol of an order of Christian warriors known as the Knights Hospitaller or Knights of Malta.

Maltese cross may also refer to:

"Maltese Cross" (Law & Order: Criminal Intent episode), an episode of the television show Law & Order: Criminal Intent
Maltese cross (plant) Lychnis chalcedonica, a species of flowering plant
Maltese Cross mechanism, a mechanism that translates a continuous rotation into an intermittent rotary motion
Maltese cross (optics), a pattern of four dark cones encountered in polarized light microscopy
An experiment in a Crookes tube first performed by Juliusz Plücker
A move performed on gymnastics rings
Theodore Roosevelt's Maltese Cross Cabin, a cabin used by Theodore Roosevelt
Maltese Cross is a domino game
Fatty casts found in urine during nephrotic syndrome

See also
Maltese cross medusa Lucernariopsis cruxmelitensis, a stalked jellyfish
Malta (disambiguation)